Apiciopsis is a genus of moths in the family Geometridae. Its type species is Apiciopsis obliquaria.

References

Ennominae
Geometridae genera